The American Motor Sleigh was made by the American Motor Sleigh Co in 1905. It was designed for travel on snow, with a single-cylinder engine which drove a pronged wheel, with runners in place of conventional wheels.

References

G. Marshall Naul, "American Motor Sleigh", in G.N. Georgano, ed., The Complete Encyclopedia of Motorcars 1885-1968  (New York: E.P. Dutton and Co., 1974), pp. 42.

Snowmobile manufacturers